Alkalihalobacillus alkalilacus is a Gram-positive, endospore-forming, aerobic, rod-shaped and motile bacterium from the genus of Alkalihalobacillus which has been isolated from sediments from the Sambhar Lake in Jaipur.

References

Bacillaceae
Bacteria described in 2018